The 2007–08 Czech Extraliga season was the 15th season of the Czech Extraliga since its creation after the breakup of Czechoslovakia and the Czechoslovak First Ice Hockey League in 1993.

Standings

Playoffs

Pre-Playoffs
HC Ocleari Trinec - HC Znojemsti Orli 3-0 on series
HC Geus Okna Kladno - HC Plzen 3-2 on series

Quarterfinals
HC Ceske Budejovice - HC Geus Okna Kladno 4-1 on series
HC Energie Karlovy Vary - HC Litvinov 4-1 on series
HC Slavia Praha - HC Ocleari Trinec 4-1 on series
Bili Tygri Liberec - HC Sparta Praha 4-0 on series

Semifinals
HC Energie Karlovy Vary - HC Ceske Budejovice 4-3 on series
HC Slavia Praha - Bili Tygri Liberec 4-3 on series

Final
HC Slavia Praha - HC Energie Karlovy Vary 4-3 on series

Playouts

Relegation
BK Mlada Boleslav - HC Slovan Ustecti Lvi 0-4, 3-0, 4-0, 4-3, 7-1

References

External links 
 

2007-08
2007–08 in European ice hockey leagues
1